World Youth Day 1995 was a Catholic youth festival that took place from January 10 to 15, 1995, in Manila, Philippines. It was the first time for an Asian country to host the event. Pope John Paul II presided over the event, marking his second trip to the country as Pope after his visit in 1981, and also the last papal visit in the country of the 20th century and 2nd millennium.

The program of the days
Since the opening ceremony, the Pope underlines the importance of the Filipino Catholic Church. At the meeting of the Federation of Asian Bishops' Conferences (FABC), the Pope points out what are the new areas of the contemporary mission: the poor of cities, migrants, refugees, young people, the media and social communications. "In the first millennium," he says, "the Cross has been planted on the soil of Europe; in the second on that of America and Africa; we can pray that in the third Christian millennium in this vast and vital continent there will be a great harvest of faith to be harvested".

Events

A week before the celebration of the World Youth Day proper, two representatives from each of countries all over the world gathered for an International Youth Forum (IYF) at the University of Santo Tomas. The Philippines sent eight representatives, while others were from the different Catholic religious youth organizations and campuses. These were the selected youth leaders and coordinators. During their five-day stay in UST, representatives were grouped and discussed issues and concerns laid out by the Episcopal Commission on Youth, on topics set months before.

The IYF was also a venue wherein few from these selected youth representative had able to have a short talk with the Pope.
Young pilgrims gathered from many different parts of the world to celebrate God together, to learn other cultures and to speak as "brothers and sisters" among themselves. There was also a Mass where some youths directly received Communion from the Pope. Youth pilgrims gathered from different parts of the world to worship and talk together. Different activities were held, including a traditional Barrio Fiesta, where it was possible to search company and entertainment. During these days, Masses were celebrated every day in most parishes throughout the Philippines.

The closing Mass, held at Luneta Park, was estimated to have been attended by more than 5 million people, the second-largest papal gathering in history.

The event saw the presence of Catholic representatives of all Chinese communities: China, Taiwan, Hong Kong, Macau, Malaysia, and Singapore. Already on January 12, the archbishop of Taipei, Joseph Ti-kang, celebrated mass with 5 priests of the "official" Chinese Roman Catholic Church. On January 14, through Radio Veritas, the pope launches a message of reconciliation between the "official" and underground Chinese Church addressed to "all the Catholic faithful". At the end of the Mass in Luneta Park, the Pope greeted in Chinese, the language of China and Taiwan.

This was Pope John Paul II's last visit to the Philippines, as his scheduled return for the World Meeting of Families in January 2003 fell through due to the progression of Parkinson's disease.

Official song
The official song for World Youth Day 1995 was released in 1994, titled "Tell the World of His Love", composed by Trina Belamide.

Theme
"As the Father has sent me, so am I sending you". (Jn 20:21) the same as that of the World Youth Day of 1994, which was celebrated at the diocesan level on Palm Sunday of that year, fall on March 27.

John Paul II's assassination attempt

Ramzi Yousef, an Al-Qaeda member, attempted to assassinate the Pope in the Bojinka Plot, but the plan was discovered four days earlier and Yousef fled to Pakistan.

Notes and references

External links
Guinness Book of World Records – Largest Papal Crowd
 JMJ 1994–1995

1995
1995 in the Philippines
1995 in Christianity
January 1995 events
History of Manila
History of Metro Manila
20th century in Manila
Pope John Paul II
Catholic Church in the Philippines
Presidency of Fidel V. Ramos
Holy See–Philippines relations
Foreign trips by popes